Anders Mannelqvist (born 27 August 1964) is a Swedish biathlete. He competed in the men's 20 km individual event at the 1992 Winter Olympics.

References

External links
 

1964 births
Living people
Swedish male biathletes
Olympic biathletes of Sweden
Biathletes at the 1992 Winter Olympics
Sportspeople from Västerbotten County
20th-century Swedish people